Fontaine-Heudebourg is a former commune in the Eure department in the Normandy region in northern France. On 1 January 2016, it was merged into the new commune of Clef-Vallée-d'Eure.

Population

See also
Communes of the Eure department

References

Former communes of Eure